Faywood is a census-designated place in Grant County, New Mexico, United States. Its population was 33 as of the 2010 census. Faywood has a post office with ZIP code 88034.

Demographics

History
The area was the site of hot springs which drew visitors from 1859, when a hotel and bath house was built by William Watts. By 1900, the Faywood settlement was created and named for the developers of the Faywood Hot Springs, J.C. Fay, William Lockwood. A third developer was T.C. McDermott. The post office was moved northeast to Dwyer, but is still named the Faywood Post Office.

Climate
Faywood has a cool semi-arid climate (Köppen BSk) with hot summers and mild winters.

See also
 City of Rocks State Park
 Faywood Hot Springs
 NAN Ranch, National Register of Historic Places
 NAN Ranch Ruin, archaeological site 
 Swarts Ruin, Mimbres culture archaeological site

References

Census-designated places in New Mexico
Census-designated places in Grant County, New Mexico